The year 534 BC was a year of the pre-Julian Roman calendar. In the Roman Empire, it was known as year 220  Ab urbe condita. The denomination 534 BC for this year has been used since the early medieval period, when the Anno Domini calendar era became the prevalent method in Europe for naming years.

Events

By place

Europe 
 Lucius Tarquinius Superbus becomes the seventh king of Rome, after murdering his predecessor Servius Tullius.
 Competitions for tragedy are instituted at the City Dionysia festival in Athens.
 The Etruscan founded the city of Felsina, that later will become the modern city of Bologna

Births

Deaths 
 Servius Tullius, sixth king of Rome

References